The following is the result of the 1988 Virginia Slims of Oklahoma singles.

Elizabeth Smylie was the defending champion but did not compete that year.

Lori McNeil won in the final 6–3, 6–2 against Brenda Schultz.

Seeds
A champion seed is indicated in bold text while text in italics indicates the round in which that seed was eliminated.

  Lori McNeil (champion)
  Katerina Maleeva (first round)
  Raffaella Reggi (semifinals)
  Catarina Lindqvist (semifinals)
  Dianne Balestrat (first round)
  Helen Kelesi (quarterfinals)
  Jana Novotná (quarterfinals)
  Kathleen Horvath (first round)

Draw

References
 1988 Virginia Slims of Oklahoma Draw

1998 Singles
1988 WTA Tour